The siege of Nagakubo (長窪城) was a battle of Japan's Sengoku period. It took place in 1543 as part of Takeda Shingen's bid to control Shinano Province, Japan.  He took the castle of his former ally, Oi Sadataka, who had deserted him to ally with Murakami Yoshikiyo. Oi was sent to Takeda's home city of Kōfu as a prisoner, where he was then killed.

References
Turnbull, Stephen (1998). 'The Samurai Sourcebook'. London: Cassell & Co.

1543 in Japan
Nagakubo 1543
Nagakubo 1543
Conflicts in 1543